The Brian Wilson and Jeff Beck 2013 Tour was a 2013 tour starring Brian Wilson and Jeff Beck. The shows featured Wilson's former bandmates Al Jardine, David Marks and Blondie Chaplin.

Background
Following The Beach Boys fiftieth anniversary tour, Brian Wilson, Al Jardine and David Marks decided to tour as a trio. The three played several shows in July 2013. On August 5, it was announced that Jeff Beck would accompany them for a tour in September and October, featuring Blondie Chaplin at select shows. The tour would help promote an upcoming Wilson record that featured Beck on several songs. Beck called the tour a dynamic of "classic surfing safari music and this weird stuff that I do," and promised "it will sound like it's all of one accord." Wilson remarked that Beck "brings that great guitar-player kind of thing to the picture."

"For four days," Beck later recalled, "I sat there and didn't even know Brian was in the room. He was so quiet, he never uttered a syllable. And yet they gave me these parts that allegedly he'd written. Then we were offered some shows together: 'Jeff, this is gonna be the tour of the year!' They should've got the bloody record done first, but they got excited and we ended up doing the Jeff Beck-Brian Wilson tour, prematurely."

Tour dates

References

2013 concert tours